The 1981 CART PPG Indy Car World Series season, the third in the CART era of U.S. open-wheel racing, consisted of 11 races,  beginning in Avondale, Arizona  on March 22 and concluding at the same location on October 31.  The PPG Indy Car World Series Drivers' Champion was Rick Mears despite missing Round 2 at Milwaukee due to injuries sustained in the Indianapolis 500. Rookie of the Year was Bob Lazier.  After the disagreement with the USAC during the previous season, the 65th Indianapolis 500 was not part of the Series, however no competing race was scheduled and most CART teams and drivers did take part.

Drivers and constructors 
The following teams and drivers competed for the 1981 CART World Series.

Notable team and driver changes 

 Tom Sneva leaves Jerry O'Connell Racing for new team Bignotti-Cotter Racing. The team scales back to part-time for 1981.
 Team Penske expands to a three-car operation, with Bill Alsup joining. His owner-driver team Alsup Racing only runs part-time in 1981.
 After racing limited schedule beforehand, Tony Bettenhausen Jr. runs his first full-time season with new owner-driver team Bettenhausen Racing.
 Dick Simon replaces Sheldon Kinser at Leader Card Racing, leaving Kinser without a ride. Simon's old team, Vollstedt Enterprises, does not compete.
 Mario Andretti returns to running the majority of the races after a stint in Formula One, driving for Patrick Racing. He replaces Tom Bagley, who is left without a ride.
 Rookie driver Scott Brayton runs a full schedule with family owned team Brayton Racing.
 After running part-time in 1980, Machinists Union Racing runs a full schedule with driver Larry Dickson.
 Spike Gehlhausen is replaced at Bob Fletcher Racing by rookie driver Bob Lazier.
 Josele Garza runs his first season with family-owned team Garza Racing.
 Steve Chassey runs his first full-time season for the Jet Engineering team.
 AMI Racing only runs two races in 1981 after running full-time in 1980. Gary Bettenhausen is left without a full-time ride.
 Interscope Racing also stops running full-time, along with driver Danny Ongais.
 At Cannon Racing, Larry Cannon only runs the first few races, with most of the rest driven by Dick Ferguson.
 This is Bobby Unser's final season of IndyCar racing. See the 1981 Indianapolis 500 for more information.

Notable Equipment Changes 

 Tempero Racing switches from an Eagle to McLaren chassis.
 Menard Racing switches from an Offenhauser to Chevrolet engine. With this shift the Cannon Racing team is the only full-time team that still uses Offenhauser engines.

Schedule 
Of note is the addition of the inaugural Michigan 500 to replace the California 500 at the now closed Ontario Motor Speedway.

- The Detroit News Grand Prix was supposed to run for 150 miles, but was shortened due to a scoring error.
 Oval/Speedway  Dedicated road course

Season Summary

Race Results 

Note, the total time of the Norton Michigan 500 does not include red flag stoppage time as the race was stopped for nearly 1 hour due to a bad pit lane fire

Final driver standings

See also
 1981 Indianapolis 500
 1981–82 USAC Championship Car season

References
 
 
 

Champ Car seasons
Indycar season